Gridders is a 1994 puzzle video game developed by Tetragon and published by The 3DO Company (under the Studio 3DO brand) for the 3DO Interactive Multiplayer. It was also included as a pack-in game for the 3DO Blaster, an add-on produced and designed by Creative Labs to allow Microsoft Windows to play 3DO games. The game follows Zack, a worker for the Gridder Corporation run by Lazarus R. Trench, and his dog companion Fidex entering the factory in order to reach a mysterious secret within its basement. The player acts as Zack and must explore 36 floors, navigating squares and collecting pyramid keys by solving puzzles, while avoiding Gridder blocks and obstacles.

Gridders was the creation of Tetragon, a Texas-based game developer founded in 1993 by Mark Skaggs, known for leading the team that created the Facebook game FarmVille at Zynga, in addition of working as executive producer at Electronic Arts on titles such as Command & Conquer: Red Alert 2, Command & Conquer: Generals, and The Lord of the Rings: The Battle for Middle-earth. Joey Bryant served as lead artist, while the soundtrack was composed by Doug Benson. The game was met with mixed reception from critics, some of which reviewed it as an import title. Tetragon would go on to port Hell: A Cyberpunk Thriller for the 3DO and develop NanoTek Warrior for the PlayStation.

Gameplay 

Gridders is a three-dimensional puzzle game reminiscent of Klax. It takes place in the year 2049, where depletion of finite natural resources by humans led the Earth to an ecological disaster. The United World Council enlisted aid of the Gridders Corporation run by Lazarus R. Trench, who fiercely protects a proprietary technology from manufacturing automatons dubbed Gridders used in his factory and refuses to open their operations to any government or institution. As the Gridders grew more sophisticated and efficient, the company's working payroll was reduced from 1550 workers to one 20-year old called Zack. One day, Zack arrived to work and found a written note signed by a person named "Sandra", stating that a secret is hidden within the depths of the factory.

Acting as Zack, who is joined by his dog companion Fidex, the player must explore 36 floors to reach the mysterious secret within the basement of the Gridders Corporation. The player navigates squares in order to collect green pyramid keys required to complete each level by solving puzzles, while avoiding Gridder blocks that can instantly crush Zack. Each floor becomes increasingly difficult and complex as the player progresses further, introducing additional obstacles such as trap doors, elevator squares, and diversion squares that are also key to solve a level. Zack can collect items that are either beneficial or harmful to the player. The player can also change between two different camera perspectives during gameplay. Every sixth level is a bonus round where Zack must lit a pattern of squares and get "non-dud" Gridder blocks land on them in order to become blue diamonds, which are worth extra points.

Development and release 
Gridders was created by Tetragon, a Texas-based video game developer founded in 1993 by Mark Skaggs, an American game producer and executive known for leading the team that created the Facebook game FarmVille at Zynga. Skaggs also served as executive producer on titles such as Command & Conquer: Red Alert 2, Command & Conquer: Generals, and The Lord of the Rings: The Battle for Middle-earth at Electronic Arts. Joey Bryant served as the game's lead artist, creating all the animations for the main character and cutscenes as traditional cel animation. The soundtrack was composed by Doug Benson.

Gridders was first published for the 3DO in North America between August and September 1994, and later in Japan on November 18 of that year by The 3DO Company (Studio 3DO). It was also included as a pack-in game for the 3DO Blaster, an add-on produced and designed by Creative Labs that allow compatible Windows-based PCs to play 3DO titles. Tetragon would later work for GameTek in porting the PC game Hell: A Cyberpunk Thriller to the 3DO Interactive Multiplayer, as well as Virgin Interactive with NanoTek Warrior for the PlayStation, before the company was shut down four years later.

Reception 

Gridders was met with mixed reception from critics, some of which reviewed it as an import title. VideoGamess Jeffrey Adam Young commended its graphics for making use of the 3DO hardware with the three-dimensional space and smooth transition between viewpoints. Adam Young also found the sound to be decent, and its gameplay accessible but addictive and challenging, but stated that the plot was not essential for a puzzle game. Electronic Gaming Monthlys five reviewers regarded it as one of the better titles for the platform, highlighting its difficulty in later levels and cinematics, stating that "Fans of puzzle games like Tetris and Pac-Attack will definitely take to this game." GamePros Earth Angel saw its "realistic" 3D visuals as the main draw and a first for puzzle games, while giving a positive remark to the audio. Angel commented that Zack was easy to control, and the gameplay easy to understand but complex and difficult in the more complicated levels. 

An editor for Génération 4 felt that the game was very repetitive and annoying despite its original concept. 3DO Magazines Stuart Wynne praised the graphical engine, CD music and sound effects, commending Tetragon for attempting to produce a new style of game. Regardless, Wynne wrote that "despite all its efforts ... this is another puzzler unlikely to break out of its ghetto making for that classic puzzler finishing line: it's okay and if you like this sort of thing, you'll probably like this." Entertainment Weeklys Bob Strauss commended the visuals and "unique" perspective, but found it less addictive and harder to understand compared to Tetris, writing that "Gridders is a perfect example of how the fledgling system has become overly impressed while forgetting altogether about impressing consumers." MAN!ACs Martin Gaksch also gave the title a very mixed outlook.

References

External links 

 Gridders at GameFAQs
 Gridders at MobyGames

1994 video games
3DO Interactive Multiplayer games
3DO Interactive Multiplayer-only games
Pack-in video games
Puzzle video games
Single-player video games
The 3DO Company games
Video games developed in the United States
Video games set in the 2040s